Jameh Mosque of Qom is one of the oldest mosques in Qom. Qom's mosque is located in downtown Qom.

References

Mosques in Iran
Mosque buildings with domes
National works of Iran
Qom